The 2010 Premier Trophy was contested prior to the start of the Premier League season. The Reigning champions were the Kings Lynn Stars. The 2010 champions were the Newcastle Diamonds after beating the Birmingham Brummies 104-80 over a two legged final. The 2010 campaign was the last Premier Trophy campaign as it was dropped for the 2011 season.

North Group
The North Group was contested between Berwick Bandits, Edinburgh Monarchs, Glasgow Tigers, Newcastle Diamonds and Workington Comets. Newcastle topped the group and qualified for the Premier Trophy Semi-finals.

Fixtures & Results

Last updated: December 10, 2010. Source: BSPA

Colours: Blue = home win; Red = away win; White = draw

Home team listed in the left-hand column

Table

Midland Group
The Midland Group was contested between Birmingham Brummies, Redcar Bears, Scunthorpe Scorpions, Sheffield Tigers and Stoke Potters. Birmingham topped the group and qualified for the Premier Trophy Semi-finals. They also remained unbeaten throughout the group stage becoming the first team in the Premier Trophy to achieve this feat.

Fixtures & Results

Last updated: December 10, 2010. Source: BSPA

Colours: Blue = home win; Red = away win; White = draw

Home team listed in the left-hand column

Table

South Group
The South Group was contested between Kings Lynn Stars, Newport Wasps, Rye House Rockets, and Somerset Rebels. Rye House topped the group and qualified for the Premier Trophy Semi-finals. Kings Lynn also qualified to the semi finals been the best placed 2nd place team from the 3 groups.

Fixtures & Results

Last updated: December 10, 2010. Source: BSPA

Colours: Blue = home win; Red = away win; White = draw

Home team listed in the left-hand column

Table

Semi-finals

Leg 1

Leg 2

Final

First leg

Second leg

Speedway competitions in the United Kingdom
Premier Trophy
Speedway Premier Trophy